This is a list of approaches, styles, methodologies, philosophies in software development and engineering. It also contains programming paradigms, software development methodologies, software development processes, and single practices, principles and laws.

Some of the mentioned methods are more relevant to a specific field than another, such as automotive or aerospace. The trend towards agile methods in software engineering is noticeable, however the need for improved studies on the subject is also paramount. Also note that some of the methods listed might be newer or older or still in use or out-dated, and the research on software design methods is not new and on-going.

Software development methodologies, guidelines, strategies

Large-scale programming styles 

 Behavior-driven development
 Design-driven development
 Domain-driven design
 Secure by design
 Test-driven development
 Acceptance test-driven development
 Continuous test-driven development
 Specification by example
 Data-driven development
 Data-oriented design

Specification-related paradigms 

 Iterative and incremental development
 Waterfall model
 Formal methods

Comprehensive systems 
 Agile software development
 Lean software development
 Lightweight methodology
 Adaptive software development
 Extreme programming
 Feature-driven development
 ICONIX
 Kanban (development)
Unified Process
Rational Unified Process
OpenUP
Agile Unified Process

Rules of thumb, laws, guidelines and principles 
 300 Rules of Thumb and Nuggets of Wisdom (excerpt from Managing the Unmanageable - Rules, Tools, and Insights for Managing Software People and Teams by Mickey W. Mantle, Ron Lichty)
ACID
Big ball of mud
Brooks's law
C++ Core Guidelines (Stroustrup/Sutter) P1 - P13 Philosophy rules
CAP theorem
Code reuse
Command–query separation (CQS)
Cowboy coding
Do what I mean (DWIM)
Don't repeat yourself (DRY)
Egoless programming
Fail-fast
Gall's law
General Responsibility Assignment Software Patterns (GRASP)
If it ain't broke, don't fix it
Inheritance (OOP)
KISS principle
Law of Demeter, also known as the principle of least knowledge
Law of conservation of complexity, also known as Tesler's Law
Lehman's laws of software evolution
 Loose coupling
 Minimalism (computing)
Ninety–ninety rule
 Open–closed principle
 Package principles
Pareto principle
 Parkinson's law
Principle of least astonishment (POLA)
 Release early, release often
 Robustness principle, also known as Postel's law
 Rule of least power
 SEMAT
 Separation of concerns
Separation of mechanism and policy
 Single source of truth (SSOT)
 Single version of the truth (SVOT)
 SOLID (object-oriented design)
There's more than one way to do it
Uniform access principle
Unix philosophy
Worse is better
You aren't gonna need it (YAGNI)

Other 
 Davis 201 Principles of Software Development
 Don't Make Me Think (Principles of intuitive navigation and information design)
The Art of Computer Programming (general computer-science masterpiece by Donald E. Knuth)
The Cathedral and the Bazaar - book comparing top-down vs. bottom-up open-source software
The Philosophy of Computer Science
Where's the Theory for Software Engineering?
The Yo-yo problem

Programming paradigms 
 Agent-oriented programming
 Aspect-oriented programming (AOP)
Convention over configuration
 Component-based software engineering
 Functional programming (FP)
Hierarchical object-oriented design (HOOD)
 Literate programming
 Logic programming
 Modular programming
 Object-oriented programming (OOP)
Procedural programming
 Reactive programming

Software development methodologies 
 Agile Unified Process (AUP)
 Constructionist design methodology (CDM)
 Dynamic systems development method (DSDM)
 Extreme programming (XP)
 Iterative and incremental development
 Kanban
 Lean software development
 Model-based system engineering (MBSE)
 Open Unified Process
 Pair programming
 Rapid application development (RAD)
 Rational Unified Process (RUP)
 Rubber duck debugging
 Scrum
 Structured systems analysis and design method (SSADM)
 Unified Process (UP)

Software development processes 
 Active-Admin-driven development (AADD)
 Behavior-driven development (BDD)
 Bug-driven development (BgDD)
 Configuration-driven development (CDD)
 Readme-driven development (RDD)
 Design-driven development (D3)
 Domain-driven design (DDD)
 Feature-driven development (FDD)
 Test-driven development (TDD)
 User-centered design (UCD) (User-Driven Development (UDD))
 Value-driven design (VDD)
Software review
Software quality assurance

See also 
 Anti-pattern
Coding conventions
 Design pattern
 Programming paradigm
 Software development methodology
 Software development process
 Outline of computer science
 Outline of software engineering
 Outline of computer engineering
 Outline of computer programming
 Outline of software development
 Outline of web design and web development
 Outline of computers
 :Category:Programming principles

Further reading 

 ISO/IEC/IEEE 26515:2018(E) - ISO/IEC/IEEE International Standard - Systems and software engineering — Developing information for users in an agile environment

Other materials, books, articles, etc. 
 Don't Make Me Think (book by Steve Krug about human computer interaction and web usability)

References 

 
Software development process
Methodology
Computer science